The 1st Pornhub Awards was held on September 6, 2018 at the Belasco Theater in Los Angeles. It was hosted by Asa Akira and featured a performance by Kanye West.

Award winners and nominees 

Winners are in bold.

Additional award winners 

 Realer Than Reality—Top VR Performer: Megan Rain
 Up Close And Personal—Top POV Performer: Mark Rockwell
 Most Popular Network: Team Skeet
 Blowjob Queen—Top Blowjob Performer: Miss Banana
 Splash Zone—Top Squirting Performer: Abella Danger
 Back Door Beauty—Top Anal Performer: Danika Mori
 Most Popular Parody Channel: Wood Rocket
 Most Popular MILF Channel: Moms Teach Sex
 Most Popular VR Channel: DaBoink
 Tantalizing Twinkie—Top Twink Performer: Joey Mills
 Glorious Grizzly—Top Bear Performer: Colby Jansen
 The Whole Squad—Top Gay Group Performer: Johnny Rapid
 Blowjob King—Top Gay Blowjob Performer: Darius Ferdynand
 Top Comment on Pornhub: PhatCockRocket
 Get Your Freak On—Top Fetish Performer: Prettykittymiaos
 Mrs. Dressup—Top Cosplay Performer: Mattie Doll
 Solo Siren—Top Female Solo Performer: Lilcanadiangirl
 Most Popular Verified Amateur: Lindsey Love
 Most Popular Verified Professional Model: Bryci
 Most Popular Verified Couple: LeoLulu

Fan award winners 

 Best Dick (Fan Award): Johnny Sins
 Nicest Pussy (Fan Award): Dillion Harper
 Nicest Tits (Fan Award): Kendra Sunderland
 Hottest Female Ass (Fan Award): Mia Malkova
 Hottest Male Ass (Fan Award): Johnny Sins
 Best Cumshot (Fan Award): Danny D
 Hottest Inked Model (Fan Award): Karmen Karma
 Favorite MILF (Fan Award): Brandi Love
 Favorite Trans Model (Fan Award): Natalie Mars
 Favorite Gay Model (Fan Award): William Seed
 Favorite BBW Model (Fan Award): Marilyn Mayson
 Favorite Fetish Model (Fan Award): Mandy Flores
 Cam Performer of the Year (Fan Award): Jenny Blighe
 Favorite Channel (Fan Award): Brazzers
 Funniest Performer (Fan Award): Jordi El Niño Polla
 Best Premium Snapchat (Fan Award): Dani Daniels
 Best Porn Twitter (Fan Award): Riley Reid
 Instagrammer of the Year (Fan Award): Nicolette Shea

Production 
On August 7, 2018 Pornhub announced Asa Akira would host the award show. In early September 2018 reports stated Kanye West would be a creative director for the show. On September 3, 2018 Pornhub and West confirmed the partnership. Unlike other award shows such as the AVN's or XBIZ Awards winners would be decided on users streaming data from the website. The data compiled from mid-March 2018 until the day before the show on September 5 were used to find the winners of the categories. There was also a fan award portion which fans vote in a poll-style system from mid-August 2018 until the event in September on pornhub.com.

Kanye West and Teyana Taylor performed at the show. The show was held at the Belasco Theater in Downtown Los Angeles.

References

External links 

 2018 Pornhub Awards at Internet Adult Film Database

2018 awards
Pornographic film awards
MindGeek